Helsingin Palloseura (HPS) is a sports club from Helsinki, Finland established in 1917. HPS has been active in several sports including bandy, ice hockey, football, handball and basketball.

Historically, HPS men's team is one of the most successful football teams in Finland, winning nine national championships during the 1920s and 1930s. The team is currently playing in the fourth highest league, however. In bandy, the club was the runner-up for the Finnish championship in 1920.

Famous HPS footballers have included William Kanerva, Aulis Koponen, Max Viinioksa, Kai Pahlman, Jyrki Heliskoski and Pertti Alaja.

Football

Achievements
HPS Helsinki's men's team won the Finnish football championship (Mestaruussarja) 9 times and they also played in the European Cup, against Stade de Reims in 1958–59.  Their one success in the Men's Finnish Cup (Miesten Suomen Cup) was in 1962.

 Men's Finnish Champions (Mestaruussarja Winners): 1921, 1922, 1926, 1927, 1929, 1932, 1934, 1935, 1957
 Men's Finnish Cup (Miesten Suomen Cup): 1962

Brief history of men's team

The first football match played by HPS men's team in September 1918 against HIFK. The club won their first Finnish championship three years later in 1921. It also won the Mestaruussarja championship in 1922, 1926, 1927 and 1929.  However, the club's golden age was in the 1930s, when the HPS men won three championships over a four-year period (1932, 1934, 1935). Success at this time was also recognised by the large number of players receiving national recognition by representing the Finnish national side. In the 1940s success was in turn mixed with Finnish football having been disrupted by the war years. In 1940/41 HPS finished bottom of the Mestaruussarja and were relegated but were promoted back to the championship level in 1943/44.

They were relegated again in 1949 and did not compete in the Mestaruussarja again until 1956.  They won the championship for the last time in 1957 and were most unfortunate a year later in 1958 when they finished equal on points with KuPS Kuopio to whom they then lost 1–0 in a championship play-off final.  They maintained their place in the championship until 1964 when they were relegated, which was the last time that the club competed at the highest level.

There then followed a gradual downward spiral with HPS fluctuating between Miesten Ykkönen (Men's First Division), Miesten Kakkonen (Men's Second Division) and Miesten Kolmonen (Men's Third Division). In 1997 HPS returned to the Kakkonen which culminated in them reaching the play-offs at the end of 1998 season when they drew 0–0 and 1–1 against FC HIFK.  However they missed out on promotion on away goals.  Disaster was soon to follow as in 1999 HPS abandoned their place in the Kakkonen because of economic difficulties and had no option but to reform in 2000 at the lowest level in the Seiska (Seventh Division).  However, in the last 10 years the club have seen 5 promotions and 1 relegation and they are now competing again in the Kolmonen.

European campaigns

HPS men have played in Europe on two occasions, the first time being in the European Cup in the 1958–59 season and the second time being in the Cup Winners' Cup in the 1963–64 season.

Divisional movements since 1930

Top Level (28 seasons): 1930–42, 1945–49, 1956–64
Second Level (18 seasons): 1943/44, 1950–55, 1965–70, 1972, 1974–76, 1983
Third Level (13 seasons): 1971, 1973, 1977–82, 1984, 1988–89, 1997–98
Fourth level (19 seasons): 1985–87, 1990, 1992–93, 1995–96, 2009–19
Fifth Level (5 seasons): 1991, 1994, 2005, 2007–08
Sixth Level (2 seasons): 2004, 2006
Seventh Level (1 season): 2003
Eight Level (3 seasons): 2000–02

Season to season

26 seasons in Veikkausliiga
18 seasons in Ykkönen
12 seasons in Kakkonen
19 seasons in Kolmonen
5 seasons in Nelonen
2 seasons in Vitonen
1 season in Kutonen
3 seasons in Seiska

Junior Football
The club has a thriving youth section running a large number of teams with around 700 players.  Junior coaching is seen as the key to creating a sound foundation for the development of the club in the future.  HPS's mission is to be a local club serving the Pakila-Paloheinä-Torpparimäki and Oulunkylä-Maunula areas by offering soccer as a hobby for children and youngsters.  Educational values, teamwork and consideration of others are key aspects that are delivered.

Current season Women

For the season 2018 the representative team of HPS, HPS women's I, competes in the Naisten Ykkönen, in the second highest national level.

Current women's Squad

Current season men

For the 2014 season HPS men compete in Section 1 (Lohko 1) of the Kolmonen administered by the Helsinki SPL and Uusimaa SPL.  This is the fourth highest tier in the Finnish football system.

HPS/2 men are participating in Section 1 (Lohko 1) of the Nelonen administered by the Helsinki SPL.

HPS/Jägers are participating in Section 3 (Lohko 3) of the Kutonen administered by the Helsinki SPL.

Current men's Squad

Ice hockey
HPS played in SM-sarja for five seasons (1928, 1929, 1932, 1933 and 1934)

References and sources
  Official Website
 Helsingin Palloseura – Finnish Wikipedia
  Suomen Cup
 Helsingin Palloseura Facebook

Footnotes

Bandy clubs in Finland
Football clubs in Helsinki
Association football clubs established in 1917
Bandy clubs established in 1917
1917 establishments in Finland